The 2013 GoDaddy.com Bowl was a postseason college football bowl game held on January 6, 2013, at Ladd–Peebles Stadium in Mobile, Alabama. The 14th edition of the bowl began at 8:00 PM CST and aired on ESPN. The Kent State Golden Flashes of the Mid-American Conference competed against the Sun Belt Conference champion Arkansas State Red Wolves.

Teams

Arkansas State

Arkansas State won the Sun Belt championship, finishing the season with a 9–3 record and a 7–1 record in conference play. The team made its second consecutive appearance in the bowl and for the second consecutive year was playing without its head coach. Arkansas State had lost the prior appearance to Northern Illinois in the 2012 game.

Kent State

The GoDaddy.com Bowl was Kent State's first bowl game appearance in forty years; the team last played in the 1972 Tangerine Bowl. Kent State went 11–1 in regular season games and 8–0 in MAC play before losing the MAC Championship Game to Northern Illinois; their eleven victories set a team record. The team finished the season ranked #25 in the AP Poll. Kent State coach Darrell Hazell was MAC Coach of the Year and accepted the head coach position with the Purdue Boilermakers prior to the game.

Game summary

Scoring summary

References

External links
 ESPN summary

LendingTree Bowl
GoDaddy.com Bowl
GoDaddy.com Bowl
Arkansas State Red Wolves football bowl games
Kent State Golden Flashes football bowl games